Optical Review is a bimonthly peer-reviewed scientific journal that was established in 1994 and is published by Springer Science+Business Media in partnership with the Optical Society of Japan. The editor-in-chief is Masahiro Yamaguchi. The journal publishes research and review papers in all subdisciplines of optical science and optical engineering.

Subdisciplines include general and physical optics, spectroscopy, quantum optics, optical computing, photonics, optoelectronics, lasers, nonlinear optics, environmental optics, adaptive optics, and space optics. Optics regarding the visible spectrum, infrared, and short wavelength optics are also included. Coverage encompasses required materials as well as suitable manufacturing tools, technologies, and methodologies.

Abstracting and indexing 
The journal is abstracted and/or indexed in:

According to the Journal Citation Reports, the journal has a 2020 impact factor of 0.890.

See also 
 Applied Physics Express
 Japanese Journal of Applied Physics

References

External links 
 
 Optical Review at Optical Society of Japan website
 NLM Catalog

Optics journals
Science and technology in Japan
Publications established in 1994
Springer Science+Business Media academic journals
English-language journals
Academic journals associated with learned and professional societies